Rrencë is a village in the former municipality Guri i Zi, northern Albania. At the 2015 local government reform it became part of the municipality Shkodër. It is located 1.5 km east from the city of Shkodër and consists of 860 inhabitants and 236 houses.

References

Populated places in Shkodër
Guri i Zi, Shkodër
Villages in Shkodër County